Lynch may refer to:

Places

Australia
 Lynch Island, South Orkney Islands, Antarctica
 Lynch Point, Marie Byrd Land, Antarctica
 Lynch's Crater, Queensland, Australia

England
 River Lynch, Hertfordshire
 The Lynch, an island in the River Thames in Berkshire
 Lynch, a hamlet in the parish of Selworthy, Somerset

United States
 Lynch, Kentucky, a city
 Lynch, Maryland, an unincorporated community
 Lynch, Nebraska, a village
 Lynch Creek, California
 Lynch Glacier, Washington
 Lynch Quarry Site, North Dakota, a pre-Columbian flint quarry
 Lynch River, Virginia
 Lynch Township, Boyd County, Nebraska

People
 Lynch (surname)
 List of people with surname Lynch
 Lynch (given name), any of several people

Arts and entertainment
 Lynch (band) (styled lynch.), a Japanese rock band
 Lynch (TV series), a Colombian show

Other uses 
 7824 Lynch, an asteroid
 , any of several ships
 Lynch School of Education and Human Development, within Boston College
 Lynch Hotel, in Newton Hook, New York
 Lynch syndrome, a medical condition
 Lynch Building, former name of 11 East Forsyth in Jacksonville, Florida
 Lynch, an Old English term for an agricultural terrace

See also
 Lynch House (disambiguation)
 Lynching, an extrajudicial execution carried out by a mob
 Lynches River, North Carolina, United States
 Linch, Wyoming, United States
 Linch, a small parish in West Sussex, England